Robert xxx Ritchie is the former president and CEO of the Canada railway company, Canadian Pacific Railway.

In 1990 Ritchie succeeded William W. Stinson as president of Canadian Pacific Railway. and in 1995 succeeded I. Barry Scott as CEO. In 2004 Ritchie was awarded the Railroader of the Year by Railway Age. Ritchie stood down as president and CEO of the company in May 2006 and was replaced by Fred Green (2006–2012).

In 2011, Ritchie was named to the board of directors of GATX corporation.

Ritchie is listed by Bloomberg LP as one of the Skyservice Investments board members.

References

External links 
 Railroad Hall of Fame Bio

Living people
Year of birth missing (living people)
Canadian Pacific Railway executives
20th-century American railroad executives
21st-century American railroad executives